Aragoa is a genus of woody perennials native to the páramo of Colombia and north-western Venezuela.  It classified as the sister taxon to Littorella and Plantago, all of which are now classified in the family Plantaginaceae.  It is found at altitudes above about 3000 m.

References 

Plantaginaceae
Plantaginaceae genera
Flora of Colombia
Flora of Venezuela
Páramo flora